Rotation is a circular motion of a body about a center.

Rotation may also refer to:

Science, mathematics and computing
 Rotation (anatomy)
 Rotation (mathematics)
 Rotation (medicine), medical student training
 Bitwise rotation, a mathematical operator on bit patterns
 Curl (mathematics), a vector operator
 Differential rotation, objects rotating at different speeds
 Display rotation, of a computer monitor or display
 Earth's rotation
 Improper rotation or rotoreflection, a rotation and reflection in one
 Internal rotation, a term in anatomy
 Optical rotation, rotation acting on polarized light
 Rotation around a fixed axis
 Rotational spectroscopy, a spectroscopy technique
 Tree rotation, a well-known method used in order to make a tree balanced.

Arts, entertainment, and media

Music
 Rotation (Cute Is What We Aim For album), 2008
 Rotation (Joe McPhee album), 1977
 Rotation (music), the repeated airing of a limited playlist of songs on a radio station
 "Rotate" (song), a song on the album Channel 10 by Capone-N-Noreaga
 "Rotation",  a song on the 1979 album Rise by Herb Alpert
 "Rotation (LOTUS-2)", a song on the 2000 album Philosopher's Propeller by Susumu Hirasawa

Other uses in arts, entertainment, and media
 Rotation (film), a 1949 East German film
 Rotation (pool), a type of pocket billiards game

Politics

 Rotation government, the practice of a government switching Prime Ministers mid-term from an individual in one political party to a different individual in another political party

Other uses
 Rotation (aviation), the act of lifting the nose off the runway during takeoff
 Rotation, in baseball pitching; see the glossary of baseball
 Crop rotation, a farming practice
 Job rotation, a business management technique
 Robson Rotation, a method of having ballot papers in elections
 Stock rotation, a retail practice

See also
 Rotator (disambiguation)